Saxipoa is a monotypic genus of flowering plants belonging to the family Poaceae. The only species is Saxipoa saxicola.

Its native range is Southeastern Australia.

References

Poaceae
Monotypic Poaceae genera